Nephrocerus is a genus of flies belonging to the family Pipunculidae.

The species of this genus are found in Europe, Asia and Northern America.

Species
Nephrocerus acanthostylus Skevington, 2005
Nephrocerus atrapilus Skevington, 2005
Nephrocerus auritus Xu & Yang, 1997
Nephrocerus bullatus Shao, Huo & Yang, 2018
Nephrocerus corpulentus Skevington, 2005
Nephrocerus daeckei Johnson, 1903
Nephrocerus fatalis Churkin, 1991
Nephrocerus flavicornis Zetterstedt, 1844
Nephrocerus flexus Morakote, 1988
Nephrocerus grandis Morakote, 1988
Nephrocerus japonicus Morakote, 1988
Nephrocerus lapponicus Zetterstedt, 1838
Nephrocerus nevskajae Churkin, 1991
Nephrocerus oligocenicus Carpenter & Hull, 1939
Nephrocerus paektusanensis Kozánek & Kwon, 1992
Nephrocerus scutellatus (Macquart, 1834)
Nephrocerus slossonae Johnson, 1915
Nephrocerus spineus Morakote, 1988
Nephrocerus woodi Skevington, 2005
Nephrocerus zaitzevi Kuznetzov, 1990

References

Pipunculidae
Brachycera genera
Diptera of Europe
Diptera of Asia
Diptera of North America
Taxa named by Johan Wilhelm Zetterstedt